Zapazhye is a rural locality (a village) in Razdolyevskoye Rural Settlement, Kolchuginsky District, Vladimir Oblast, Russia. The population was 3 as of 2010. There are 2 streets.

Geography 
Zapazhye is located on the Peksha River, 18 km south of Kolchugino (the district's administrative centre) by road. Zavalino is the nearest rural locality.

References 

Rural localities in Kolchuginsky District